Sherbrooke Township is a township in Steele County in the U.S. state of North Dakota. Its population as of the 2000 Census was 62, which had dropped to an estimated 46 people as of 2009. The township shares its name with Sherbrooke, North Dakota, which was the county seat from 1885 to 1919.

History
Sherbrooke Township was organized in 1885 from survey township 146N, Range 55W. The first settlers were principally of Norwegian, Canadian, and American ancestry. Though the township was not on a major rail line, the promise of future rail service led to a growth in population with a high of 303 people in 1910. However, rail service never materialized, and in 1919 voters in Steele County decided to move the county seat to Finley, which was closer to the railroad. Losing the county seat eventually led to Sherbrooke township's gradual decline.

Geography
Sherbrooke Township is located in the central part of Steele County.

Demographics

As of the 2000 Census, there were 62 people, 23 households, and 17 families residing in the township. The racial makeup of the township was 100.0% White. The top ancestry groups in the township were Norwegian with 39%, German with 28%, and Swedish with 11%.

Of the 23 households in the township, 34.8% had children under the age of 18 living with them, 69.6% were married couples living together. Only 26.1% were non-families. The average household size was 2.70 and the average family size was 3.29.

The township's population was spread out, with 35.5% under the age of 18, 24.2% from 25 to 44, 24.2% from 45 to 64, and 16.1% who were 65 years of age or older. The median age was 38 years.

The median household income for the township was $48,750, and the median family income was $52,813. Males had a median income of $23,333 versus $26,250 for females, with a per capita income of $16,659. About 3% of population was below the poverty line.

References

External links
 U.S. Census map of Sherbrooke Township as of the 2000 Census

Townships in Steele County, North Dakota
Populated places established in 1885
Townships in North Dakota